Jaclyn Friedman (born 1971) is an American feminist writer and activist known as the co-editor (with Jessica Valenti) of Yes Means Yes: Visions of Sexual Power and a World Without Rape and Believe Me: How Trusting Women Can Change the World, the writer of Unscrewed: Women, Sex, Power and How to Stop Letting the System Screw Us All and What You Really Really Want: The Smart Girl’s Shame-Free Guide To Sex and Safety, a campus speaker on issues of feminism, sexual freedom and anti-rape activism, and the founder and former executive director of Women, Action & The Media.

Background
Friedman graduated from Wesleyan University, and earned an MFA in creative writing from Emerson College in 2004.  She lives in the Boston area. She is bisexual.

Women, Action and the Media
Friedman is the founder and former Executive Director of Women, Action and the Media (WAM!), a North American non-profit focusing on gender justice and media issues.  WAM!’s accomplishments included the successful campaigns to pressure Facebook to enforce its terms of service against incitements to violence against women and to pressure Clear Channel to rescind its decision not to run advertisements for South Wind Women's Center, a women's health clinic in Wichita.  WAM! also ran chapters in Boston, New York, Chicago, LA, DC, Ottawa and Vancouver.

Other activism
Friedman regularly speaks at college campuses on the subjects of sexuality, sexualization, rape culture, and creating a healthy sexual culture around enthusiastic consent. She also hosts a weekly podcast "Unscrewed."

In 2010 Friedman was selected as a delegate on the Nobel Women’s Initiative's peace delegation to Israel and Palestine. A documentary, Partners for Peace, has been made about the delegation, and Friedman is featured in the film.

In 2019, Friedman was arrested as part of Never Again Action, a group of Jews and allies protesting ICE and the government’s treatment of immigrants. In an interview with the Jewish Women's Archive, she identified a Reform Jewish youth group chapter in New Jersey, known as NFTY, as the source of her social justice framework.

Friedman is the 2019-2020 Activist in Residence at Suffolk University.

Controversy
In December 2010, Friedman debated Naomi Wolf on Democracy Now! concerning rape allegations against WikiLeaks founder Julian Assange, in which Wolf controversially described allegations of stealthing against Assange as representing “model cases of sexual negotiation.”

In 2012, Friedman came under fire for her piece, Unsolicited Advice For Blue Ivy Carter, which was heavily criticized by African-American women for alleged racist overtones. Friedman subsequently issued a public apology on her blog, and donated the fee she received for the piece to SisterSong, an activist group that primarily deals with women of color.

Writing
Yes Means Yes: Visions of Sexual Power and a World Without Rape, an anthology co-edited by Friedman and Jessica Valenti, was published in January 2009.  It was selected as one of Publishers Weekly Best 100 Books of 2009,  and is number 11 on Ms. magazine's list of Most Influential Feminist Books of All Time.

In 2011, inspired by the questions that young women asked her while she was on book tour for Yes Means Yes, Friedman published her second book, What You Really Really Want: The Smart Girl’s Shame-Free Guide to Sex and Safety.  What You Really Really Want was a finalist for Foreword's Book of the Year award in Women's Issues. Salon.com called it "a sex guide for today's girls," and said of Friedman that she “is the sex educator of many parents’ nightmares. She’s also just the teacher young women need.”

In 2017, Friedman published “Unscrewed: Women, Sex, Power, and How to Stop Letting the System Screw Us All” Kirkus called Unscrewed “a potent, convincing manifesto” and the text “lively, emboldening and nonjudgmental.”

In 2020, Friedman and co-editor Jessica Valenti published a second anthology, Believe Me: How Trusting Women Can Change the World. Believe Me includes essays by Congresswoman Ayanna Pressley, Tatiana Maslany, Samantha Irby, Dahlia Lithwick, Loretta Ross, Jamil Smith, Julia Serano, and more. Publishers Weekly wrote “Consistently well-written and soundly reasoned, these essays persuasively cast the tendency to doubt women as one of America’s greatest social ills. This illuminating call to action deserves a wide readership.”

Friedman's writings have been published widely, including in The New York Times, Glamour The Guardian, The American Prospect, The Washington Post, The Nation and Salon.

Media
Friedman has appeared as an expert on many shows, including Nightline, NPR’s 1A, PBS NewsHour, and Democracy Now She has also appeared on many leading podcasts like Dear Sugars and Call Your Girlfriend.

Notes

American feminist writers
Bisexual women
American bisexual writers
Emerson College alumni
Jewish American writers
Jewish women writers
Living people
Sex-positive feminists
Wesleyan University alumni
American women writers
Writers from Boston
American activists
LGBT people from Massachusetts
1971 births
Reform Jewish feminists
21st-century American Jews
21st-century American women